Zepita is a town in the Chucuito Province south of Lake Titicaca in the Puno Region, Peru.

Populated places in the Puno Region